Russian State Fire Service (Gosudarstvennaya protivopozharnaya sluzhba) is the highest fire service body of Russian Federation. A part of the Ministry of Emergency Situations since 2001, the State Fire Service is divided into the Federal Fire Service and the Fire Service of the Federal subjects of Russia.

State Fire Service's 220 000 personnel operate out of 13,600 buildings and structures, including 4000 plus fire stations containing 18,634 fire appliances and 49 fireboats.

The State Fire Service divisions participate in over two million operations a year, rescue over 90 000 lives, save property evaluated as high as 120 billion rubles.

The Institute for Fire Defense and Scientific Research and 70 special laboratories are responsible for the SFS scientific support, new technologies and methods of work.

History
The first fire service in Russia was established by Czar Alexey Mikhailovich under signed decree named "Direction on Municipal rescue", which signed on April 30, 1649, in Moscow.

Six months after the October Revolution, on April 17, 1918 Vladimir Lenin signed a decree on organisation of activities for firefighting, which was considered the birth date for the Soviet State Fire service. Up to 2001 the Fire Service was part of the Ministry of Internal Affairs of Russia.

On April 30, 1999, Russian President Boris Yeltsin signed a directive that declared April 30th as the celebratory date for Fire Services in Russia, 350 years after their creation.

On 2001 the State Fire Service became a citizen body within the Ministry of Emergency Situations, with all 278,000 firefighters transferred after 84 years under the MVD.

Forms of Fire services in Russia
In Russia, there are 5 forms of Fire Services, established by Federal Law of the Russian Federation "About fire safety".
State Fire Service
Federal Fire Service
Fire Service of the Federal subjects of Russia.
Municipal Fire service
Departmental Fire Service
Private Fire Service
Voluntary Fire Service

Divisions of State Fire Service

Federal Fire Service
The Federal Fire Service (Federalnaya protivopozharnaya sluzhba), is an integral part of the State Fire Service and is part of the Ministry of the Russian Federation for Civil Defense, Emergencies and Elimination of Consequences of Natural Disasters (Russian Ministry of Emergency Situations).

Its basic functions are:
 Conducts prevention, fire fighting and rescue work -
 at facilities that are critical to the national security of the country, other important fire facilities, the most valuable objects of cultural heritage of the peoples of the Russian Federation, for the activities at the federal level with the massive concentration of people;
 in closed administrative-territorial formations, as well as in important organizations and regime; 
  Supervises the implementation of the federal executive bodies, executive bodies of subjects of the Russian Federation, local self-government organizations and federal laws, technical regulations and other legal acts in the field of fire safety;
  Exercises operational control of other types of fire protection forces and means involved to extinguish fires at facilities that are critical to the national security of the country, other important fire facilities, the most valuable objects of cultural heritage of the peoples of the Russian Federation, as well as for the activities of the federal level with the massive concentration of people;
 Conducts monitoring of the state of fire safety in the Russian Federation is preparing proposals for government agencies and local governments to implement measures in the field of fire safety;
 Conducts fire information and education of the public on fire safety measures;
 Organizes and conducts official statistical records and state statistical reports on fires and their consequences on the territory of the Russian Federation, the performance of operational activities and resources of the Federal Fire Service, Fire Service of the Russian Federation and other types of fire protection;
 Preparing draft legislation Russian Emergencies Ministry in the field of fire safety and organization of the Federal Fire Service

The treaty units of the Federal Fire Service are maintained by the protected objects. Buildings, structures, facilities, fire and other machinery, and equipment, gear and equipment transferred to the use of contractual unit FPS, are the property of the organization and remain on its balance sheet.

Fire Service of the Russian Federation
Financial support of the Fire Service of the Russian Federation is carried out by means of:
 the budget of the Russian Federation;
 funds allocated for the financing of regional programs in the field of fire safety;
 funds received in accordance with the existing agreements, including the provision of permitted fee-based services;
 contributions, donations and other sources not prohibited by law.

Ranks

In Russia, the decals are applied symmetrically on both sides of the helmet (front and rear). The location of the decals on the special clothing and SCBA is established for each fire department of the same type within the territorial entity.

Appliances
Russian State Fire Vehicles are painted in accordance with GOST R 50574-2002 (ГОСТ Р 50574-2002 г) which requires an overall flame-red (in practice red-orange) with contrasting white doors, white bumpers, white front and rear vertical stripes and white horizontal side stripes. Undercarriages are painted black. Auxiliary vehicles lack the white doors. Any writing or numbers are of the opposite color of the color it is on. 

A unique feature is the mounting of canisters for suction hoses and ladders on top of the appliance.

The Russian Fire Service uses a number of different models of appliances which range greatly in age and technical abilities.

Firefighting vehicles are classified under the following categories:

 basic fire fighting vehicles (основные пожарные автомобили):
 basic fire fighting vehicles of general application (основные пожарные автомобили общего применения), 
 basic fire fighting vehicles intended use (основные пожарные автомобили целевого применения); 
 Special fire fighting vehicles (специальные пожарные автомобили);
 auxiliary vehicles (вспомогательные автомобили).

Operational categories 
Russian Fire appliances are operationally categorized as follows:

 Tankers (AC) (Автоцистерны (АЦ): A fire apparatus equipped with a pump, tanks for storing liquid extinguishing agents and means of their delivery, intended for delivery of personnel and equipment to the site of fire and carrying out fire extinguishing and rescue operations.

 Auto First Aid (APP) (Автомобили первой помощи (АПП)): A fire apparatus on a light chassis equipped with a pumping unit, tanks for liquid extinguishing agents, and intended for delivery of personnel, equipment to the site of a fire (accident), firefighting operations at initial stage and rescue operations.
 High-pressure Pump apparatus(AVD) (Пожарный автомобиль с насосом высокого давления (АВД)): A fire apparatus equipped with a high-pressure pump, tanks for liquid extinguishing agents, a set of equipment, intended to carry out fire extinguishing activities in high-rise buildings and structures.

 Hose and hose-pumper cars (AR, ANR) (Рукавные и насоcно-рукавные (AP, APH)
 Hose Carrier - Only carries hose
 Hose Tanker - Carries hose and water and pump
 Fire ladders (AL) (Пожарные автолестницы (АЛ))
 Boom lifts (ACP) (Коленчатые подъёмники (АКП))
 Staff cars (ASH) (Штабные автомобили (АШ))

 Cars Gas Rescue (AH, ABG) (Газодымозащитная служба (ГДЗС))
 Cars specialized fire (AGT AGVT, ACT, AP) (Автомобили специализированного тушения (АГТ, АГВТ, АКТ, АП))
 Cars Command and communications (ASO) (Автомобили связи и оcвещения (АСО))
 Rescue vehicles (ASA) (Спасательные автомобили (АСА))
 Cars Airfield Fire (Пожарный аэродромный автомобиль (AA)

See also

 Awards of the Ministry for Emergency Situations of Russia
 List of fire departments

Notes

External links

 Profile
 Fireman.ru

Fire departments
Ministry of Emergency Situations (Russia)
Firefighting by country
Government agencies of Russia